The Secretary of State for Commonwealth Relations was a British Cabinet minister responsible for dealing with the United Kingdom's relations with members of the Commonwealth of Nations (its former colonies). The minister's department was the Commonwealth Relations Office (CRO).

The position was created in 1947 out of the old positions of Secretary of State for Dominion Affairs and Secretary of State for India. In 1966, the position was merged with that of the Secretary of State for the Colonies to form that of Secretary of State for Commonwealth Affairs, which was in turn merged with the Secretary of State for Foreign Affairs in 1968 to create the new position of Secretary of State for Foreign and Commonwealth Affairs, the equivalent position today being the Secretary of State for Foreign, Commonwealth and Development Affairs.

Secretaries of State for Commonwealth Relations, 1947–1966

References
 Foreign and Commonwealth Office website

Commonwealth Relations
History of the Commonwealth of Nations
Defunct ministerial offices in the United Kingdom
1947 establishments in the United Kingdom
1966 disestablishments in the United Kingdom